Seven Story Drop is a rock band from Dallas, Texas, founded in 2000 by lead singer Jeff Current and bass guitarist Chris Dietz.

The band was named as one of Dallas' Top Ten Bands by Harder Beat magazine in 2001, "#1 Band in Dallas" by Barstar.com in 2002, and recommended for "Rock Album of the Year", "Rock Band of the Year" and "Acoustic Performance of the Year" at the 2004 Dallas Local Music Awards.

Their song "Last Man Standing" from Gravity was used in the movie No Pain, No Gain. "How Do You Like Me Now" from Skeletons was chosen by 93.3 FM KDBN in September 2008 as the official song for the Dallas Cowboys NFL football team promotions and broadcasts.

Discography

Studio albums
 Skeletons (2008)
 Gravity (2005)

Singles
 "How Do You Like Me Now" (2008)
 "Last Man Standing" (2005)

References

Alternative rock groups from Texas
Hard rock musical groups from Texas
Heavy metal musical groups from Texas
Musical groups established in 2000
Musical quartets
2000 establishments in Texas
Musical groups disestablished in 2008
Musical groups from Dallas